UAZ Bars (UAZ-3159) is a SUV produced by UAZ, Russia. The Russian Барс (Bars) translates to Leopard. It was introduced in December 1999. About 10,000 automobiles were produced since then. UAZ Bars is a passenger-utility car with 4-wheel drive, developed on the basis of UAZ-3153.

Overview
"Bars" is an widetrack (1890 mm  versus 1,785 mm (70.3 in))  of the UAZ-3153 extended wheelbase modification of the UAZ-3151, with engine ZMZ-409 with an overall length of 4550mm and a wheelbase of 2760mm. The Bars has a higher capacity of negotiating gradients, better structural strength, and steering capacity on roads of different surface quality.

The standard complete equipment has been supplemented with:

 hydro amplifier of the steering system;
 5-speed gear box;
 fine mesh transfer box.

For the UAZ-3159 'BARS' a new range of 16-valve ZMZ-406 engine has been used with electronic controlled fuel injection. The engine design comprises cast iron cylinder block, two camshafts in the engine head and timing chain.

External links
 Bars
 UAZ Bars

References

2000s cars
UAZ
Cars of Russia